Prince Ali may refer to:

People

 Prince Ali bin Hussein (born 1975), third son of King Hussein of Jordan
 Mahershala Ali (born 1974), American actor
 Mustafa Ali (born 1986), American professional wrestler
 Aly Khan (1911–1960), Pakistani diplomat of Iranian and Italian descent
 Ali Reza Pahlavi (born 1922) (1922–1954), second son of Reza Shah Pahlavi, Shah of Iran
 Ali Reza Pahlavi (born 1966) (1966–2011), member of the Pahlavi Imperial Family of the Imperial State of Iran
 Patrick Ali Pahlavi (born 1947), member of the deposed Pahlavi dynasty of Iran
 Shah Alam II (previously Prince Ali Gauhar; 1728–1806), seventeenth Mughal Emperor and the son of Alamgir II

Other uses
 Ali, a character in the Middle-Eastern folk tales One Thousand and One Nights
 "Prince Ali" (song), two musical numbers from the 1992 Disney animated film Aladdin
 Prince Ali Stadium, a multi-purpose stadium in Mafraq, Jordan

See also
 Ali (name)